"Big Foot" (ビッグフット) is the fourth major single by the Japanese band Nico Touches the Walls from their second studio album Aurora.

"Big Foot" contains five live tracks from their previous successes, all performed during the last show of their tour called Tour 2008 Bon Voyage, Etranger.

Chart position
The single was released on May 13, 2009, and reached number 24 on the Oricon Chart in Japan, that year.

Track listing
 Big Foot
 Tomato
 (My Sweet) Eden (Live)
 B.C.G. (Live)
 Kumo Sora no Akuma (Live)
 Broken Youth (Live)
 Etranger (Live)

References

 Nico Touches the Walls singles released Animes rock. Retrieved September 24

External links
Nico Touches the Walls official page 

2009 singles
Nico Touches the Walls songs
2009 songs
Ki/oon Music singles

ja:ビッグフット (NICO Touches the Wallsの曲)